Michael Cramer may refer to:

Michael Cramer (politician) (born 1949), German politician and Member of the European Parliament
Michael Cramer (actor) (1930–2000), German actor
Michael J. Cramer (diplomat), American diplomat
Michael W. Cramer (born 1943), U.S. Navy rear admiral and former director of the Office of Naval Intelligence